Barauli is a village situated in the Indian district of Kanpur Dehat. Total population of this village is approximately 4000. Neighbouring villages are Devarahat, Jallapur, Prempur, Sujaur, Madnupur, Musrahijhor, and Shelhupur.

Villages in Kanpur Dehat district